Francis Oti Akenteng is a former Ghanaian olympic athlete and coach. He is currently the Technical Director of the Ghana Football Association.

References

1955 births
Living people
Ghanaian footballers
Association footballers not categorized by position